Sound of Colors is a 2003 Hong Kong romance film directed by Joe Ma. It is an adaptation of the Taiwanese children's picture book of the same name by Jimmy Liao.

Cast 

 Tony Leung Chiu-wai as Ho Chui-Ming — the untrustworthy owner of a dating agency who inextricably goes blind
 Miriam Yeung as Cheung Hoi-Yeuk — a kind blind woman who visits a dating agency in search for love
 Chang Chen as Zhong Cheng — an advertising company sales representative in Taipei whose love letter gets sent to an incorrect address
 Dong Jie as Dong Lie — a Shanghainese businesswoman who receives the love letter
 Wing Fan — angel who sets up Zhong Cheng and Dong Lie

Reception 
Yen Sun-lun for the Taipei Times wrote, "Unfortunately, the film has turned out to be a colourful and beautiful picture that looks like an extended version of a music video. It may be creative in creating characters and plot for the originally thinly-plotted illustration book and the performances are on the whole OK, but the result is less than the sum of its parts." Ken Eisner for Variety wrote, "Tale of overlapping love stories, “Sound of Colors” finally lacks the complexity or zip to make it shine as brightly as it otherwise could." Chan Ka-ming for the Hong Kong Film Critics Society said, "Granted there is some Joe Ma humour, but the tumbling pursuit is nothing but the channeling of Wong Kar-wai."

Analysis 
賓尼 for the Hong Kong Film Critics Society wrote that the film's happy ending differs from other films of the period, whose cynical themes act as a reflection of Hong Kong's anxieties of the post 1997 Hong Kong Handover. The author noted the parallels of the two romances as a larger examination of gender dynamics in Hong Kong and Cross-Strait relations. Specifically, the author noted Ho's sudden blindness as a loss of confidence by men in Hong Kong following recent economic turmoil. This is contrasted with Cheung's confidence as a blind person as a reflection of the rising social standing of women in Hong Kong. Alternatively, Zhong Cheng and Dong Lie's successful romance as lovers from different countries is wishful thinking of improved relations between China and Taiwan.

Awards and nominations

See also 

 Turn Left, Turn Right — 2003 Hong Kong romance film also adapted from a Jimmy Liao book

References

External links 

 
 

Hong Kong romantic drama films
2003 romantic drama films
2000s Hong Kong films